Emanuel Fernando Matola (born 11 September 1967), commonly known as Nana, is a Mozambican former footballer who played as a midfielder. He played in 66 matches and scored five goals for the Mozambique national team from 1988 to 1999. He was named in Mozambique's squad for the 1998 African Cup of Nations tournament.

References

External links
 

1967 births
Living people
Mozambican footballers
Association football midfielders
Mozambique international footballers
1998 African Cup of Nations players
CD Matchedje de Maputo players
CD Costa do Sol players
Place of birth missing (living people)